Stockstadt am Rhein is a municipality in Groß-Gerau district in Hesse, Germany, lying on the southern edge of the Frankfurt Rhein-Main Region.

Geography

Location
Stockstadt lies in the Rhine rift right on the Kühkopf-Knoblochsaue EU reserve. The community lies at the mouth of the Modau, where it empties into the Rhine.

Neighbouring communities
Stockstadt borders in the north and east on the town of Riedstadt, in the south on the community of Biebesheim and in the west on the communities of Gimbsheim (Alzey-Worms) and Guntersblum (Mainz-Bingen).

Constituent communities
Stockstadt consists of only one centre.

History
Stockstadt had its first documentary mention in 830-850 in the Lorsch codex under the name Stochestat.

Politics

Municipal council
Municipal council is made up of 23 councillors, with seats apportioned thus, in accordance with municipal elections held on 12 March 2021:
CDU 11 seats (45.67%)
SPD 8 seats (35.00%)
Greens 4 seats (19.33%)

Voter participation was 43.90 %.

Coat of arms
Stockstadt's civic coat of arms might heraldically be described thus: In gules two boat hooks per saltire argent, thereabout four six-pointed stars argent.

The boat hooks refer to boatmen on the Rhine, but it is unknown what the stars are meant to stand for. The arms are based on the community's oldest known seal from the late 16th century, and were officially conferred in 1927 in Mainz colours. This is a reference to the community's history as an old (until 1579) Mainz domain.

Partnerships
  Villa Lagarina, Italy, since 1990

Economy and infrastructure

Transport
Stockstadt lies on Federal Highway (Bundesstraße) B 44 (Frankfurt am Main - Ludwigshafen). The Autobahn interchange Pfungstadt-West on the A 67 (Rüsselsheim – Viernheim) is about 9 km away.

The community is also a stop on the Mannheim–Frankfurt railway.

Education
Grundschule Stockstadt (primary school)

References

External links
 Stockstadt am Rhein

Groß-Gerau (district)